Laura Lepasalu (born 29 July 1986) is a road cyclist from Estonia. She represented her nation at the 2007 and 2008 UCI Road World Championships.

References

External links
 profile at Procyclingstats.com

1986 births
Estonian female cyclists
Living people
Place of birth missing (living people)